Graham George Coldrick (born 6 November 1945) was a Welsh professional footballer. During his career, he made over 200 appearances in the English Football League in spells with Cardiff City and Newport County.

Career

Born in Newport, Coldrick began his career at Cardiff City. A defender by trade, he made his league debut for the Bluebirds as a makeshift forward in 1963 before reverting to defence. Throughout his stay at Ninian Park he was constantly troubled by knee injuries and he eventually lost his place in the side to the on form full back pairing of David Carver and Gary Bell. He was allowed to leave the club in 1970 to join Newport County for a fee of £4,000, a club record for the Exiles at the time. He was quick to establish himself in the first team for the Somerton Park club and went on to play there for five years before joining Merthyr Tydfil. In 2015, Coldrick became the second player to be inducted into Newport County's hall of fame.

References

1945 births
Living people
Footballers from Newport, Wales
Welsh footballers
Wales under-23 international footballers
Cardiff City F.C. players
Newport County A.F.C. players
Merthyr Tydfil F.C. players
English Football League players
Association football defenders